Joseph Butler (1804–84), born in Parndon, Essex, was  an architect, surveyor and builder. His specialist area was that of church buildings. He worked widely in Sussex, England.

Career
Joseph Butler worked  as surveyor in Chichester cathedral, where he supervised R C Carpenter's restoration from 1846. Butler was responsible for the opening up of the sub-deanery in the cathedral and for its eventual removal  to a new church Saint Peter the Great, Chichester.

In 1849 Butler designed the Bishop Otter Memorial College, a college to train school teachers, Nairn and Pevesner described the [original] buildings as being of a 'sober neo-Tudor style' and were 'typically honest and unselfconscious'.

When Chichester Cathedral Spire fell down after a storm in 1861, it was rebuilt by Sir Gilbert Scott. Before the disaster, Joseph Butler had carried out a survey of the cathedral. It was with the aid of his detailed drawings that  a replica of the original spire was constructed.

During the Victorian era there was a Gothic revival in the design and restoration of churches.  Nairn and Pevesner were scathing in their criticism  of many church architects of that era describing them as 'meddlers', however they credit Butler, who built in the Gothic style, as saving many dozens of village churches.

Selection of work
Source: Sussex Parishes. Lambeth Palace Library.

Churches designed

Chichester, - St. Paul (1836);
Chichester, - St Peter the Great (1848-52 - worked as surveyor for R C Carpenter);
Plaistow (1853–54);
Stanmer (1838 – attributed)
Stedham (1850)

Churches restored or extended
Appledram (1845);
Bosham (1845);
Brighton and Hove, - St Andrew's Church, Church Road, Hove (1833-35 - contractor)
Compton (1849–51);
Fishbourne (1847);
Forest Row (1850);
Lower Beeding (1852 – unexecuted);
Mid Lavant (1844);
Pagham (1838);
Pyecombe (1842 – examined);
Sidlesham (1840 – unexecuted);
Southwick (1835 – extent of involvement uncertain);
Stoughton (1844);
Upper Beeding (1852)

Notes

References

Architects from Essex
1884 deaths
1804 births
Gothic Revival architects
English ecclesiastical architects
19th-century English architects